August Friedrich Ferdinand Graf von der Goltz (July 20, 1765 – January 17, 1832) was Minister for Foreign Affairs of Prussia between 1808 and 1814, the first person to hold that title.

Early life and ancestry 
Born into an old noble Von der Goltz family, August was the elder son of Count Carl Friedrich von der Goltz (1727-1805) and his wife, Anna Maria Karolina Rummel von Lonnerstadt (1735–1809).

Career 
He entered the diplomatic service of Prussia in 1787. He help posts in the Prussian Legations at Copenhagen, Mainz, Stockholm, and St Petersburg. In 1807 at the Peace of Tilsit when Napoleon refused to negotiate with Karl August von Hardenberg and demanded his retirement, Goltz signed the treaty in place of Hardenberg and the next year became Minister of Foreign Affairs. Goltz represented Prussia at the Congress of Erfurt in 1808. He was head of the Corporate Governance in Berlin and after the Paris Peace of 1814 he became Oberhofmarschal to the Prussian court, in 1816 the courts representative to the Bundestag, in 1817 member of council of state. In 1824 he left the Bundestag and was reappointed Oberhofmarschal.

Personal life 
On 19 September 1796 in Dresden, he married Luise Juliane von Schack (1760-1835), daughter of Gneomar Berendt Wilhelm von Schack (1730-1776) and his wife, Julie Marie Luise von Wreech (1738-1769). They had one daughter:
 Countess Auguste Marie Amalie Luise von der Goltz (1798-1837); married Count Mortimer von Maltzahn (1793-1843); and had issue

Notes and references

1765 births
1832 deaths
Counts of Germany
Prussian diplomats
Prussian politicians
Politicians from Dresden
People from the Electorate of Saxony
Foreign ministers of Prussia